Lawrence "L. C." Cole (born January 3, 1956) is an American football coach and former player.  He was the 18th head football coach at Tennessee State University in Nashville, Tennessee and he held that position for four seasons, from 1996 until 1999. His career coaching record at Tennessee State was 28–18.

After a successful, but controversial, stint as head coach at Alabama State University, Cole revived the storied football program at Montgomery, Alabama's Sidney Lanier High School; during Cole's two years at Lanier, the Poets won the City Championship each year, and they never lost to a city opponent. Lanier reached the state playoffs each year, making it to the quarterfinals in 2006. On December 3, 2008, Cole was announced as Stillman College's third head coach since the reinstatement of the program in 1999 in replacing Greg Thompson. Following the 2010 season, Cole was fired as head coach, and replaced with Stillman alumnus Teddy Keaton.

Personnel
Lawrence Cole has a wife, Mitzi Ann Parker Cole, and a son, Clay Cole. His wife was born in Madison, Wisconsin. His son is from Nashville, Tennessee. His parents are Ruby Cole and Timothy Cole. He was the fourth of nine brothers.

Cole went to the University of Nebraska 1975-1979 and coached there through 1982 under Tom Osborne.

Head coaching record

College

References

1956 births
Living people
American football defensive ends
Alabama State Hornets football coaches
Allen Yellow Jackets football coaches
Ball State Cardinals football coaches
Cincinnati Bearcats football coaches
Concordia College (Alabama) Hornets football coaches
Eastern Michigan Eagles football coaches
Kansas State Wildcats football coaches
Morgan State Bears football coaches
Nebraska Cornhuskers football coaches
Nebraska Cornhuskers football players
Stillman Tigers football coaches
Tennessee State Tigers football coaches
Texas Southern Tigers football coaches
Toledo Rockets football coaches
Wisconsin Badgers football coaches
High school football coaches in Alabama
Sportspeople from Springfield, Ohio
African-American coaches of American football
African-American players of American football
20th-century African-American sportspeople
21st-century African-American sportspeople